Vadim Alexandrovich Shipachyov (born 12 March 1987) is a Russian professional ice hockey forward for Ak Bars Kazan of the Kontinental Hockey League (KHL). He previously played for Severstal Cherepovets, SKA Saint Petersburg, HC Dynamo Moscow of the KHL and the Vegas Golden Knights of the National Hockey League (NHL).

Playing career
On 4 May 2017, he signed with the Vegas Golden Knights making him the second person in history to be signed by the Golden Knights. On 15 October, he made his debut for the Golden Knights against the Boston Bruins and scored his first NHL goal on Bruins' goaltender Tuukka Rask. On 29 October, he was suspended by the Golden Knights for failing to report to their AHL affiliate. The following day, it was announced that he had decided to return to Russia, and that his contract would be terminated as soon as he had cleared unconditional waivers. On 9 November, the Golden Knights announced that their contract with Shipachyov was terminated, and that he was able to return to play in the Kontinental Hockey League (KHL).

On 11 November, Shipachyov signed with SKA Saint Petersburg of the Kontinental Hockey League (KHL) for the remainder of the 2017–18 KHL season. In 22 regular season games, Shipachyov tallied 25 points, helping SKA finish top of the league. In the post-season, he was unable to help SKA repeat as champions, losing in the conference finals against CSKA Moscow contributing 11 points in 14 games.

As a free agent after completing his fifth season with St. Petersburg, Shipachyov left to sign a two-year contract with Dynamo Moscow on May 17, 2018.

During his four year tenure with Dynamo Moscow, Shipachyov led the team in scoring each year and also the league for three consecutive seasons before he was traded following the 2021–22 campaign, along with Vyacheslav Voynov to Ak Bars Kazan in exchange for financial compensation on 4 May 2022. He was later signed on 18 May 2022, to a three-year contract extension to remain with Ak Bars through 2025.

International play

 

Shipachyov has played for the Russian national team in the World Championships and World Cup of Hockey. He was the top scorer of the 2016 IIHF World Championship in which Russia won the bronze medal. He won a gold medal as a member of the Olympic Athletes from Russia team at the 2018 Winter Olympics.

On 23 January 2022, Shipachyov was named to the roster to represent Russian Olympic Committee athletes at the 2022 Winter Olympics.

Career statistics

Regular season and playoffs

International

Awards and honors

References

External links

1987 births
Living people
People from Cherepovets
HC Dynamo Moscow players
Ice hockey players at the 2018 Winter Olympics
Ice hockey players at the 2022 Winter Olympics
Olympic ice hockey players of Russia
Medalists at the 2018 Winter Olympics
Medalists at the 2022 Winter Olympics
Olympic medalists in ice hockey
Olympic gold medalists for Olympic Athletes from Russia
Olympic silver medalists for the Russian Olympic Committee athletes
Russian ice hockey centres
Severstal Cherepovets players
SKA Saint Petersburg players
Undrafted National Hockey League players
Vegas Golden Knights players
Sportspeople from Vologda Oblast